Rafael Bordalo Pinheiro Museum is a municipal museum, in Lisbon, Portugal. It is entirely dedicated to the life and works of the artist Rafael Bordalo Pinheiro (1846–1905). It shows many of his collections of caricatures and ceramics.

External links 
 Official site

Museums in Lisbon
Art museums and galleries in Portugal
Bordalo Pinheiro, Rafael
Bordalo Pinheiro